Peace Be Still is the debut album from Detroit gospel singer Vanessa Bell Armstrong. The title track became a signature song for Armstrong.

Track listing 
Side A:
 Peace Be Still (6:28)
 Labor In Vain (2:59)
 I Have Surrendered (3:14)
 He's Real (5:00)
Side B:
 He Looked Beyond My Faults 
 Any Way You Bless Me
 God So Loved The World
 God, My God

CD re-release 
Not to be confused with this studio album, there is also a re-released compilation CD entitled Peace Be Still which includes tracks from this album as well as Bell Armstrong's two subsequent releases for Muscle Shoals Sound Records, 1984's Chosen, and 1986's Following Jesus.

 Peace Be Still
 Walk With Me
 He's My Everything
 Teach Me, Oh Lord
 I'm Going Through
 He's Real
 Any Way You Bless Me
 Waiting
 What He's Done For Me

References

External links
 
 Peace Be Still on Malaco.com
 Peace Be Still (Re-release) on Malaco.com

1983 debut albums
Vanessa Bell Armstrong albums